Gancourt-Saint-Étienne is a commune in the Seine-Maritime department in the Normandy region in northern France.

Geography

Population

Places of interest
 A sixteenth century seigneurial manorhouse.
 The seventeenth-century church of St. Etienne.
 The chapel of Saint-Etienne-des-Prés
 A twelfth-century stone cross.
 The twelfth-century church of Saint-Médard at Bouricourt.

See also
Communes of the Seine-Maritime department

References

Communes of Seine-Maritime